is a railway station in Iwamizawa, Hokkaidō, Japan. The station is numbered A12.

Lines
Kami-Horomui Station is served by the Hakodate Main Line.

Station layout
The station consists of an island platform serving two tracks, with the station situated above the tracks. The station has automated ticket machines and Kitaca card readers. The station is unattended.

Platforms

Adjacent stations

References

Railway stations in Hokkaido Prefecture
Railway stations in Japan opened in 1907